Dil Tujhko Diya (दिल तुझको दिया, "The heart given to you") is a  1987 Indian Bollywood film directed and produced by Rakesh Kumar. It stars Kumar Gaurav and Rati Agnihotri in pivotal roles.

Cast
 Kumar Gaurav as Vijay "Chhotu" "Munna" Sahni
 Rati Agnihotri as Rati
 Mala Sinha as Savitri
 Parikshat Sahni as Ajay Sahni
 Aruna Irani as Mary / Meera V. Sahni
 Suresh Oberoi as Ashok A. Sahni
 Amrish Puri as Mohla
 Sharat Saxena as Advocate Heera
 Leela Chitnis as Mrs. Sahni, Grandmother
 Gurbachchan Singh as Mahesh
 Piloo J. Wadia as Angry Teacher
 Asit Sen as Teachers' Day Speaker
 Pinchoo Kapoor as Girdharilal

Soundtrack
The music is composed and written by Rajesh Roshan.

External links

1980s Hindi-language films
1987 films
Films scored by Rajesh Roshan